Theodore I (? – 28 January 687) was the Ecumenical Patriarch of Constantinople from 677 to 679.  He had been preceded by Constantine I of Constantinople.  During this cataclysmic period, the Byzantine military overcame the Arab incursion against its walls in the Arab siege of Constantinople (674-678). He was succeeded by Patriarch George I of Constantinople.

References 

7th-century patriarchs of Constantinople